The Nutty Professor (known as Julius F. Kelp in the original film (1963) and as Prof. Sherman Klump in the 1996 remake, and by his alter ego Buddy Love in both films) is a fictional character portrayed by Jerry Lewis in The Nutty Professor and its respective sequel, and by Eddie Murphy in the 1996 version and its 2000 sequel Nutty Professor II: The Klumps. Julius F. Kelp is an awkward and shy but intelligent and lively chemistry professor. Sherman Klump is a jolly, kind-hearted science teacher at Welman College. Murphy also played the rest of Klump's family in the sequel. Lewis was not fond of Murphy's characters, due to excessive fart jokes in the films.

Films

The Nutty Professor (1963)

In the 1963 film Professor Julius Kelp is known for his clumsiness and generally shy and awkward demeanor. When he meets the beautiful and attentive Ms. Purdy he tries various methods to have a more charming persona. When he creates his serum it seems at first to have terrible consequences but this is dissipated when he arrives at the local bar. His alter ego Buddy Love is known for his ease for words and assertiveness but also for his brash behavior and aggressive attitude. He also possesses a talent for singing and playing the piano. Nevertheless, the serum seems to dwindle as he reverts after a short while and even seems to lose his singing at times. At the end the serum's effect ends and he reverts in the midst of a song with the school's big band.

The Nutty Professor (1996)

Throughout the first film, Professor Sherman Klump is portrayed as highly intelligent and generally respected by his students, as well as being a fundamentally friendly man, but has occasional clumsy accidents due to his obesity. Additionally, his lack of confidence makes him a victim to bullying and verbal abuse from the Dean of the university. Having recently fallen in love with grad student and chemistry teacher Carla Purty (Jada Pinkett Smith), Klump uses his latest discovery, a weight-loss serum that rewrites the subject's genes, to lose weight in order to spend time with her. Unfortunately, this serum creates the confident but mean-spirited individual known as Buddy Love, as the testosterone imbalance caused by the transformation results in Buddy manifesting as an independent personality instead of just being a thin Sherman. When Klump's student and assistant Jason learns what has happened, he realizes that Buddy is gaining increasingly greater freedom from the professor's influence. This encourages Klump to take back control of his life, disposing of most of the serum and 'fighting' Buddy for control of the body before Buddy can drink enough of the last samples of the serum to eliminate Klump forever. At the conclusion, Klump admits what has happened to the faculty staff after he transforms back to normal in public, concluding that he must learn to accept himself as he is.

Nutty Professor II: The Klumps

In the second movie Klump's kind personality is polluted by the Buddy Love gene in his DNA, causing him to occasionally say offensive or insulting things to people without realizing, especially when talking to his new love interest Denise (Janet Jackson). In an attempt to eliminate this, Klump uses a risky experiment to extract Buddy's DNA from his system, but his plan backfires and results in Buddy manifesting as an independent entity (albeit with some dog-like traits as his genetic make-up filled in the gaps with samples of canine DNA). Klump proposes to Denise, who happily accepts, but Klump gradually begins to lose his intelligence due to the damage his brain cells have sustained as a result of Buddy being extracted from his system. Eventually, he is able to reabsorb Buddy by using a powerful version of his new youth serum to regress Buddy to amniotic fluid allowing him to 'drink' Buddy and regain his old intellect. However, Buddy dies and evaporates into a public coin fountain. Denise and Klump's father, Cletus, arrive just in time to help him when he loses his intelligence. Cletus forces Klump to drink the water from the fountain, which still retains enough of Buddy's genetic pattern, and he regains his intelligence. Later, he and Denise are married.

In other media
Sherman Klump appears in the third season Robot Chicken episode "Endless Breadsticks".

References

Fictional African-American people
Film characters introduced in 1963
Fictional characters with dissociative identity disorder
Fictional mad scientists
Fictional professors
Fictional scientists in films
The Nutty Professor
Male characters in film